Hartness is a surname. Notable people with the surname include:

Ann Hartness (born 1936), American academic research librarian
Helen Hartness Flanders (1890–1972), American ballad collector
Henry Hartness, English footballer
James Hartness (1861–1934), American inventor, entrepreneur, and governor of Vermont

See also
 Hartness State Airport, public airport near Springfield, Vermont